Dietrich Kilian (3 May 1928 – 6 September 1984) was a German musicologist.

Career 

Kilian was born in Roßlau. He studied at the Freie Universität Berlin and earned the doctorate in 1956 with a thesis "Das Vokalwerk D. Buxtehudes – Quellenstudien zu seiner Überlieferung und Verwendung" (The vocal works by D. Buxtehude – study of the sources regarding tradition and use). He was from 1958 an editor of the Neue Bach-Ausgabe, the critical edition of the complete works by Johann Sebastian Bach, editing, including critical reports, for the rest of his life, on the cantatas (I/13), the orchestral works (VII/3) and the organ works (IV/5–7). With Alfred Dürr and Klaus Hofmann and others, he authored Kritischer Bericht (Critical Commentary).

He rediscovered and published in 1963 the prelude in C major by Buxtehude (BuxWV 138).

Selected works 

Neue Ausgabe sämtlicher Werke: Serie 1, Kantaten. Bd. 13. Kantaten zum 1. Pfingsttag. Kritischer Bericht, Deutscher Verlag für Musik, 1960
Neue Ausgabe sämtlicher Werke. Serie I, Kantaten: Kantaten zum 20. und 21. Sonntag nach Trinitatis : kritischer Bericht, Band 25, Verlag Bärenreiter, 1997
Präludien, Toccaten, Fantasien und Fugen für Orgel: kritischer Bericht, Teil 1, Verlag Bärenreiter, 1978
Das Vokalwerk Dietrich Buxtehudes: Quellenstudien zu seiner Überlieferung und Verwendung, Verlag Berlin., 1956
Neun Kantaten für vier Singstimmen und Instrumente, Band 8 von Dietrich Buxtehudes Werke, illustrierte Neuauflage, Verlag Broude International Editions, 1978

Literature 

 Reinmar Emans: Die Neue Bach-Ausgabe. In: Jochaim Lüdtke (ed.), Bach und die Nachwelt, vol. 4 (1950-2000), Laaber-Verlag, 2005, p. 289-303, p. 297ff.,

References

External links
 
 Bach Bibliography bw.edu
 The New Bach Edition / Series I: Cantatas Bärenreiter
 Kilian Open Library

1928 births
1984 deaths
20th-century German musicologists